A compressed earth block (CEB), also known as a pressed earth block or a compressed soil block, is a building material made primarily from an appropriate mix of fairly dry inorganic subsoil, non-expansive clay, sand, and aggregate. Forming compressed earth blocks requires dampening, mechanically pressing at high pressure, and then drying the resulting material. If the blocks are stabilized with a chemical binder such as Portland cement they are called compressed stabilized earth block (CSEB) or stabilized earth block (SEB).

Creating CEBs differs from rammed earth in that the latter uses a larger formwork into which earth is poured and manually tamped down, creating larger forms such as a whole wall or more at one time, rather than building blocks. CEBs differ from mud bricks in that the latter are not compressed, but solidify through chemical changes that take place as they air dry. The compression strength of properly made CEB usually exceeds that of typical mud brick. Building standards have been developed for CEB.

CEBs are assembled onto walls using standard bricklaying and masonry techniques. The mortar may be a simple slurry made of the same soil/clay mix without aggregate, spread or brushed very thinly between the blocks for bonding, or cement mortar may also be used for high strength, or when construction during freeze-thaw cycles causes stability issues. Hydraform blocks are shaped to be interlocking.

Development
CEB technology has been developed  for low-cost construction, as an alternative to adobe, and with some advantages.  A commercial industry has been advanced by eco-friendly contractors, manufacturers of the mechanical presses, and by cultural acceptance of the method.  In the United States, most general contractors building with CEB are in the Southwestern states: New Mexico, Colorado, Arizona, California, and to a lesser extent in Texas.  The methods and presses have been used for many years in Mexico, and in developing countries.

The South African Department of Water Affairs and Forestry considers that CEB, locally called "Dutch brick", is an appropriate technology for a developing country, as are adobe, rammed earth and cob. All use natural building materials. In 2002 the International Institute for Energy Conservation was one of the winners of a World Bank Development Marketplace Award for a project to make an energy-efficient Dutch brick-making machine for home construction in South Africa. By making cheaper bricks that use earth, the project would reduce housing costs while stimulating the building industry.
The machine would be mobile, allowing bricks to be made locally from earth.

Various types of CEB production machines exist, from manual to semi-automated and fully automated,  with increasing capital-investment and production rates, and decreased labor.  Automated machines are more common in the developed world, and manual machines in the developing world.

An abnormal result of a compressive strength of 45 MPa (6,500 psi) was obtained in one sample. The authors of this paper intended to show, with the abnormal test result, that earth responds differently from brittle masonry, and perhaps should be tested using different methods than those used for traditional brittle masonry.

Advantages
 Minimal or no need for mortar, thus reducing both the labor and materials costs.
 Transport cost: Suitable soils are often available at or near the construction site.
 Strengths might exceed the ASTM standard for concrete blocks (1900 psi) in some instances. In India, the observed compressive strength and flexural strength of CSEB at 28 days of aging with 9% cement stabilization has been observed to be 3.2 MPa (464 psi) and 1 MPa (145 psi) respectively. With 7% cement and sandy soil 3-4 MPa (435 - 580 psi) compressive strength has resulted. 
 Non-toxic: like bricks, materials are completely natural, non-toxic, and do not out-gas (with the possible exception of chemically inert noble gases like helium or radon if naturally occurring radioactive material is present)
 Sound resistant: an important feature in high-density neighborhoods, residential areas adjacent to industrial zones
 Fire resistant: like bricks, earthen walls do not burn
 Insect resistant: like bricks, insects are discouraged because the walls are solid and very dense, and have no food value
 No need for process heat in production or for calcination of calcium carbonate (unless cement is used) therefore the material is inherently low-carbon and can be made carbon neutral quite easily (by employing carbon neutral power to the compression machines)

Disadvantages
There is a wait-time required with this construction technique because after the blocks are pressed, materials must dry.
The mixture of the interlocking blocks must be consistent and just moist enough. If the mixture is too dry, it will collapse after it has been hydraulically pressed; but if the mixture has too much water, it cannot be solidified. 
There is also the risk of erosion from weather conditions such as wind or rain that could threaten the stability of the blocks. Reinforcement using plaster might be required to ensure that the wall is durable in weather conditions such as rain and wind. 
Power is needed on-site for the compressing machines. In off-grid applications this is quite often supplied by a diesel generator, thus worsening the carbon balance
Workforce trained to produce and construct interlocking blocks is limited.
Being understudied, the durability of these blocks has not been seen in environments other than rural developments.
Like most unreinforced masonry, the tensile strength is orders of magnitude lower than the compression strength; this limits the architectural options.
Earth blocks tend to lose strength and dimensional stability when coming in contact with water for a long period of time. In some cases, it may lead to the complete disintegration of the block.

Presses
CEB had very limited use prior to the 1980s. It was known in the 1950s in South America, where one of the most well-known presses, the Cinva Ram, was developed by Raul Ramirez in the Inter-American Housing Center (CINVA) in Bogota, Colombia.  The Cinva Ram is a single-block, manual-press that uses a long, hand-operated lever to drive a cam, generating high pressure.

Industrial manufacturers produce much larger machines that run with diesel or gasoline engines and hydraulic presses that receive the soil/aggregate mixture through a hopper. This is fed into a chamber to create a block that is then ejected onto a conveyor.

During the 1980s, soil-pressing technology became widespread. France, England, Germany, South Africa and Switzerland began to write standards. The Peace Corps, USAID, Habitat for Humanity and other programs began to implement it into housing projects.

Finishing
Completed walls require either a reinforced bond beam or a ring beam on top or between floors and if the blocks are not stabilized, a plaster finish, usually stucco wire/stucco cement and/or lime plaster. Stabilized blocks can be left exposed with no outer plaster finish. In tropical environments, polycarbonate varnish is often used to provide an additional layer of wet-weather protection.

Foundations
Standards for foundations are similar to those for brick walls. A CEB wall is heavy. Footings must be at least 10 inches thick, with a minimum width that is 33 percent greater than the wall width. If a stem wall is used, it should extend to an elevation not less than eight inches (200 mm) above the exterior finish grade. Rubble-filled foundation trench designs with a reinforced concrete grade beam above are allowed to support CEB construction.

Strength
Using the ASTM D1633-00 stabilization standard, a pressed and cured block must be submerged in water for four hours. It is then pulled from the water and immediately subjected to a compression test. The blocks must score at least a 300 pound-force per square inch (p.s.i) (2 MPa) minimum.  This is a higher standard than for adobe, which must score an average of at least 300 p.s.i. (2 MPa)

References

Soil-based building materials
Sustainable building
Appropriate technology
Masonry
Natural materials
Sustainable technologies